Nikki G. Setzler (born August 7, 1945) is a politician who is the Democratic member of the South Carolina Senate, representing the 26th District since 1976. In November 2020, Setzler announced that he would step down as Minority Leader.

After the resignation of North Dakota's Ray Holmberg on June 1, 2022, Setzler became the country's longest serving, incumbent state senator.

References

External links
 Official Nikki Setzler for State Senate site
South Carolina Legislature - Senator Nikki G. Setzler official SC Senate website
Project Vote Smart - Senator Nikki G. Setzler (SC) profile
Follow the Money - Nikki G. Setzler
2006 2004 2002 2000 1996 campaign contributions

|-

|-

1945 births
21st-century American politicians
Living people
Democratic Party South Carolina state senators